The 2001 Taça de Portugal Final was the final match of the 2000–01 Taça de Portugal, the 61st season of the Taça de Portugal, the premier Portuguese football cup competition organized by the Portuguese Football Federation (FPF). The match was played on 10 June 2001 at the Estádio Nacional in Oeiras, and opposed two Primeira Liga sides Marítimo and Porto. Porto defeated Marítimo 2–0 to claim their eleventh Taça de Portugal.

As a result of Porto winning the Taça de Portugal, the Dragões qualified for the 2001 Supertaça Cândido de Oliveira where they took on 2000–01 Primeira Liga winners Boavista at the Estádio do Rio Ave FC.

Match

Details

References

2001
2000–01 in Portuguese football
FC Porto matches
C.S. Marítimo matches